Ludovic Mercier (born 1 November 1976) is a French former rugby union player.

He is a fly half. He was one of the quickest players in history to reach 500 Premiership points; his goal-kicking and place kicking being his particular strengths. Whilst at Gloucester he started in the 2002 Zurich Championship Final (the year before winning the play-offs constituted winning the English title) in which Gloucester defeated Bristol Rugby, scoring one conversion and seven penalties. He also started in the 2003 Powergen Cup Final in which Gloucester defeated Northampton Saints. In the final Mercier scored four conversions, three penalties and a drop goal.

In June 2010 he joined Aironi for their first season in the Celtic League.

Honours
Gloucester Rugby
Anglo-Welsh Cup (2003)
European Challenge Cup (2006)

References

French rugby union players
1976 births
Living people
Gloucester Rugby players
FC Grenoble players
Section Paloise players
Rugby union fly-halves
Expatriate rugby union players in England
Expatriate rugby union players in Italy
French expatriate sportspeople in England
French expatriate sportspeople in Italy
Petrarca Rugby players
Aironi players
French expatriate rugby union players
Stade Aurillacois Cantal Auvergne players
AS Béziers Hérault players
French rugby union coaches
People from Angoulême
Sportspeople from Charente